Kathleen Dunn(e) may refer to:

Kathleen S. Dunn, dialect coach
Kathleen Dunn (boxer) in 2005 Women's World Amateur Boxing Championships
The Picture of Kathleen Dunne, song on Again (Oliver album)

See also
Katy Dunn (disambiguation)
Catherine Dunn (disambiguation) / Katherine Dunn